Shewanella oneidensis is a bacterium notable for its ability to reduce metal ions and live in environments with or without oxygen. This proteobacterium was first isolated from Lake Oneida, NY in 1988, hence its name.

S. oneidensis is a facultative bacterium, capable of surviving and proliferating in both aerobic and anaerobic conditions. The special interest in S. oneidensis MR-1 revolves around its behavior in an anaerobic environment contaminated by heavy metals such as iron, lead and uranium. Experiments suggest it may reduce ionic mercury to elemental mercury and ionic silver to elemental silver. Cellular respiration for these bacteria is not restricted to heavy metals though; the bacteria can also target sulfates, nitrates and chromates when grown anaerobically.

Name 
This species is referred to as S. oneidensis MR-1, indicating "manganese reducing", a special feature of this organism. It is a common misconception to think that MR-1 refers to "metal-reducing" instead of the original intended "manganese-reducing" as observed by Kenneth H. Nealson, who first isolated the organism.

Qualities

Metal Reduction 
S. oneidensis MR-1 belongs to a class of bacteria known as "Dissimilatory Metal-Reducing Bacteria (DMRB)" because of their ability to couple metal reduction with their metabolism. The means of reducing the metals is of particular controversy, as research using scanning electron microscopy and transmission electron microscopy revealed abnormal structural protrusions resembling bacterial filaments that are thought to be involved in the metal reduction. This process of producing an external filament is completely absent from conventional bacterial respiration and is the center of many current studies.

The mechanics of this bacterium's resistance and use of heavy metal ions is deeply related to its metabolism pathway web. Putative multidrug efflux transporters, detoxification proteins, extracytoplasmic sigma factors and PAS domain regulators are shown to have higher expression activity in presence of heavy metal. Cytochrome c class protein SO3300 also has an elevated transcription. For example, when reducing U(VI), special cytochromes such as MtrC and OmcA are used to form UO2 nanoparticles and associate it with biopolymers.

Chemical modification 
In 2017 researchers used a synthetic molecule called DSFO+ to modify cell membranes in two mutant strains of Shewanella. DSFO+ could completely replace natural current-conducting proteins, boosting the power that the microbe generated. The process was a chemical modification only that did not modify the organism's genome and that was divided among the bacteria's offspring, diluting the effect.

Pellicle formation 
Pellicle is a variety of biofilm that is formed between the air and the liquid in which bacteria grow. In a biofilm, bacterial cells interact with each other to protect their community and co-operate metabolically (microbial communities). In S. oneidensis, pellicle formation is typical and is related to the process of reducing heavy metal. Pellicle formation is extensively researched in this species. Pellicle is usually formed in three steps: cells attach to the triple surface of culture device, air and liquid, then developing a one-layered biofilm from the initial cells, and subsequently maturing to a complicated three-dimensional structure. In a developed pellicle, a number of substances between the cells (extracellular polymeric substances) help maintain the pellicle matrix. The process of pellicle formation involves significant microbial activities and related substances. For the extracellular polymeric substances, many proteins and other bio-macromolecules are required.

Many metal cations are also required in the process. EDTA control and extensive cation presence/absence tests show that Ca(II), Mn(II), Cu(II) and Zn(II) are all essential in this process, probably functioning as a part of a coenzyme or prosthetic group. Mg(II) has partial effect, while Fe(II) and Fe(III) are inhibitory to some degree. Flagella are considered to contribute to pellicle formation. The biofilm needs bacterial cells to move in a certain manner, while flagella is the organelle which has locomotive function. Mutant strains lacking flagella can still form pellicle, albeit much less rapidly.

Applications

Nanotechnology
S. oneidensis MR-1 can change the oxidation state of metals. These microbial processes allow exploration of novel applications, for example, the biosynthesis of metal nanomaterials. In contrast to chemical and physical methods, microbial processes for synthesizing nanomaterials can be achieved in aqueous phase under gentle and environmentally benign conditions. Many organisms can be utilized to synthesize metal nanomaterials. S. oneidensis is able to reduce a diverse range of metal ions extracellularly and this extracellular production greatly facilitates the extraction of nanomaterials. The extracellular electron transport chains responsible for transferring electrons across cell membranes are relatively well characterized, in particular outer membrane c-type cytochromes MtrC and OmcA. A 2013 study suggested that it is possible to alter particle size and activity of extracellular biogenic nanoparticles via controlled expression of the genes encoding surface proteins. An important example is the synthesis of silver nanoparticle by S. oneidensis, where its antibacterial activity can be influenced by the expression of outer membrane c-type cytochromes. Silver nanoparticles are considered to be a new generation of antimicrobial as they exhibit biocidal activity towards a broad range of bacteria, and are gaining importance with the increasing resistance in antibiotics by pathogenic bacteria. Shewanella has been seen in laboratory settings to bioreduce a substantial amount of palladium and dechlorinate near 70% of polychlorinated biphenyls (PCBs). The production of nanoparticles by S. oneidensis MR-1 are closely associated to the MTR pathway (e.g. silver nanoparticles), or the hydrogenase pathway (e.g. palladium nanoparticles).

Wastewater treatment 
S. oneidensis' ability to reduce and absorb heavy metals makes it a candidate for use in wastewater treatment.

DSFO+ could possibly allow the bacteria to electrically communicate with an electrode and generate electricity in a wastewater application.

Genome

As a facultative anaerobe with a branching electron transport pathway, S. oneidensis is considered a model organism in microbiology. In 2002, its genomic sequence was published. It has a 4.9Mb circular chromosome that is predicted to encode 4,758 protein open reading frames. It has a 161kb plasmid with 173 open reading frames. A re-annotation was made in 2003.

References

External links
 New bacterial behavior observed PNAS study documents puzzling movement of electricity-producing bacteria near energy sources, abstract at Eurekalert
 'Rock-Breathing' Bacteria Could Generate Electricity and Clean Up Oil Spills, ScienceDaily (Dec. 15, 2009)
 Bacteria that can form electric circuits?
 Type strain of Shewanella oneidensis at BacDive – the Bacterial Diversity Metadatabase

Alteromonadales
Pollution control technologies